Sea Around Us may refer to:

 The Sea Around Us (film), a 1953 American documentary film directed by Irwin Allen
 The Sea Around Us, a book by Rachel Carson
 The Sea Around Us (song), Irish folk song written by Dominic Behan
 Sea Around Us (organization), an international research initiative